Duscha is a German-language surname of slavic origin (polish dusza="soul"). Notable people with the surname include:

 Ina Duscha (1935), Austrian film actress
 Julius Duscha (1924–2015), American journalist

German-language surnames
Surnames from nicknames